"No Place to Hide" is the 264th episode of the American television series, ER. The episode aired on April 27, 2006 on NBC.

Plot synopsis
Clemente is paranoid. Jody's husband keeps sending him condolences cards, the latest one contains dead fish. He is afraid to go home and suspicious of strangers including med student Jane. Things only get worse when Bobby calls him up with threats. He tries to get Abby to write him a prescription for something to help him sleep but she tells him to go and see his regular doctor.

Pratt is on his way to the Sudan. He is packing his cases when he notices some earrings on his table. He leaves these at the hospital for Olivia. When she comes around to the ER Frank gives them to her. She admits they're pretty - but they don't belong to her. On the aeroplane Pratt starts to flirt with an attractive woman called Vatima. He tries to impress her with his profession and destination. She quizzes him on the problems in Darfur and Pratt's enthusiasm ebbs. When the plane lands Pratt holds up the line while his bags are searched. A paperback causes particular concern and Debbie has to step in to move the line along. As Pratt and Debbie travel to the IDP camp Pratt shows a flippant attitude to the situation that irritates Debbie. The janjaweed ride up on horses and force their car to stop. The driver is given a broken nose but Pratt and Debbie aren't harmed when they say they're doctors. Their medical supplies are taken, their car is made unusable and their shoes are stolen. Their only option now is to walk to the camp.

When they arrive Pratt has to bandage his bleeding feet. When he takes a walk through the medical tents he gets into trouble straight away by walking in on a rape exam. He meets with Dr. Dakarai and reunites with Carter who asks for news of County. Pratt tells him about Luka and Abby expecting a baby which Carter contemplates for a moment then declares this good news. He starts to talk about Clemente but they are interrupted by a disturbance in the camp. A member of the janjaweed has been captured and is surrounded by the camp's men who are beating him with sticks. Pratt tries to rush in and stop them but is knocked to the floor. As he watches a teenage boy smashes the man's head in with a rock. Later Pratt drinks some alcohol he smuggled in a mouthwash bottle.

Guest starring
Noah Wyle as Dr. John Carter
John Leguizamo as Dr. Victor Clemente 
Dahlia Salem as Dr. Jessica Albright
Sara Gilbert as Intern Dr.Jane Figler
Eamonn Walker as Dr. Stephen Dakarai 
Mary McCormack as Debbie
 Laura Ceron as Nurse Chuny Marquez
 Yvette Freeman as Nurse Haleh Adams
 Abraham Benrubi as Desk Clerk Jerry Markovic
 Troy Evans as Desk Clerk Frank Martin

External links
 Full Cast & Crew at the Internet Movie Database

ER (TV series) episodes
2006 American television episodes